The Çorum pogrom or Çorum massacres occurred in the province of Çorum in Turkey between May and July 1980. Extremist Sunni Muslims, who were part of a "nationalist youth" campaign, targeted the Alevi Turkish minority and killed more than 50.  More than 200 were injured. Another target was the social-democratic Republican People's Party (CHP). Many victims were young people and women.

Islamist militants of the far-right Nationalist Movement Party (MHP) attacked a district where predominantly Alevi Turkish citizens live as a minority, causing the death of (according to an official source) 57 leftists and wounding hundreds of people, predominantly Alevi Turkish citizens.

In 2012 "former rightist agitator" Adnan Baran stated that uncertainty remains about the exact nature of the events and urged that a dialogue between the rightists and leftists take place in order to better understand the events, which he speculated might have been part of a larger military plan to set up a pretext for the Sept. 12, 1980 coup d'état.

See also 
 Sivas massacre
 Maraş Massacre
 1995 Gazi Quarter riots

References

Massacres in 1980
Corum Massacre
Corum Massacre
Corum Massacre
Massacre of Corum
1980 in Turkey
Grey Wolves (organization) attacks
May 1980 events in Europe
June 1980 events in Europe
July 1980 events in Europe
1980 murders in Turkey
Political violence in Turkey